Disorder is a 2015 French-Belgian drama-thriller film directed by Alice Winocour about a home invasion, starring Matthias Schoenaerts as an ex-soldier with PTSD. It was screened in competition in the Un Certain Regard section at the 2015 Cannes Film Festival.

Plot
Vincent (Matthias Schoenaerts), is an ex-soldier suffering from post-traumatic stress disorder (PTSD) after returning from Afghanistan. He is hired to protect the wife of a wealthy businessman while he's out of town, at their luxurious villa, Maryland, on the French Riviera.

Cast
 Matthias Schoenaerts as Vincent
 Diane Kruger as Jessie
 Paul Hamy as Denis
 Zaïd Errougui-Demonsant as Ali
 Percy Kemp as Imad Whalid
 Mickaël Daubert as Kévin
 Franck Torrecillas as Franck

Production
On 1 October 2014, Deadline reported that Matthias Schoenaerts and Diane Kruger would co-star in the film directed by Alice Winocour.

Filming began on the French Riviera on 15 October 2014. Most of the film takes place in the Domaine la Dilecta at the Cape of Antibes. The beach scenes were shot at the Plage de Passable in Saint-Jean-Cap-Ferrat. A car chase scene was shot in Col d'Èze on 14 November 2014. Production was completed on 11 December 2014.

Release
Disorder premiered at the 2015 Cannes Film Festival in the Un Certain Regard section on 16 May 2015, and was released in France and Belgium on 30 September 2015. Sundance Selects bought the film three days after its Cannes premiere.  The film was screened in the Gala Presentations section of the 2015 Toronto International Film Festival.

A trailer was released on 25 July 2015, and the poster was released on 30 July 2015.

Reception
Disorder received generally positive reviews from critics, especially for Matthias Schoenaerts' performance. On Rotten Tomatoes, the film has a rating of 73%, based on 80 reviews, with an average rating of 6.4/10. The website's critical consensus states, "Well-acted and solidly crafted, Disorder (Maryland) relies on patiently established slow-burning tension to set the stage for an intelligent, intimate psychological thriller." On Metacritic, the film has a score of 66 out of 100, based on 22 critics, indicating "generally favorable reviews".

Varietys critic Guy Lodge wrote:

Writing for Empire, Kim Newman gave the film 4 out of 5 stars, writing that "Director-writer Alice Winocour’s simmering thriller/character study is like a Transporter film directed by Chantal Akerman, with superb work from Matthias Schoenaerts as a buttoned-down, paranoid ex-soldier who senses evil forces in every shadow…"

Accolades

Soundtrack
Mike Lévy, better known as Gesaffelstein, produced a full-length musical score for this film. The soundtrack was released on 24 September 2015, as a limited release of 1,000 copies.

Remake
On 15 September 2016, Deadline reported that Taylor Sheridan had been hired by Sony Pictures and Escape Artists to script the American remake of Disorder. Escape Artists’ Todd Black, Jason Blumenthal, Steve Tisch and Tony Shaw were said to be producing the remake and David Beaubaire overseeing it for the studio. James Mangold was named as the director.

See also
 List of films featuring home invasions
 List of films featuring mental disorders

References

External links
 
 
 
 

2015 films
2015 drama films
2015 thriller drama films
French thriller drama films
Belgian thriller drama films
2010s French-language films
Films directed by Alice Winocour
Films set on the French Riviera
Films shot in France
Films about post-traumatic stress disorder
French-language Belgian films
2010s French films